Lorenza, bebé a bordo, or simply Lorenza is a Mexican comedy television series created by André Barren and Bárbara Torres that aired on Las Estrellas from 22 March 2019 to 1 December 2020. The series stars Bárbara Torres as the titular character.

The series has been renewed for a second season, that premiered on 1 September 2020.

Plot 
Lorenza is a flight attendant of obsessive character, with an insistent dislike to men, caused by a love disappointment following an infidelity committed six years ago by Luis Enrique, her ex-boyfriend, with her twin sister Raymunda. In all this time, Lorenza has lost contact with Luis Enrique and Raymunda, despite the unsuccessful attempts of her ex-boyfriend and her sister, to look for her and ask her for forgiveness. Lorenza's life undergoes an unexpected turn, when she reunites with Raymunda, who, on the verge of dying, leaves her in charge of her one-year-old baby, Emiliano. Lorenza is looking for ways to cope with her new rhythm of life but everything gets complicated, so she decides to give him up for adoption to a children’s home, but she regrets before formalizing the process. However, Lorenza understands that she is not able to take care of the baby and in desperation asks for help to her nanny Chayo, who cared for her and her sister since they were little. Lorenza is given the task of searching for Emiliano's biological father with the help of his her friend Valentina and Chayo.

Cast

Main 
 Bárbara Torres as Lorenza Arteaga Vitte, a chief flight attendant and instructor of a low-cost airline called Aerosol. She is perfectionist, structured and likes to respect the rules however she turns chaotic and clumsy when she becomes the mother of her nephew Emiliano.
 Moisés Arizmendi as Luis Enrique Negroe Martínez, Lorenza's ex-boyfriend. He ended his relationship with Lorenza after he "mistakenly" cheated on her with her twin Raymunda. He is Lorenza's accomplice who will help her find Emiliano's father.
 Marcela Lecuona as Valentina Avendaño, Lorenza's best friend and confidant. She is also a flight attendant. She prefers unstable relationships and has never fallen in love, until she meets Luciano. Emiliano’s arrival to Lorenza's apartment causes her to rethink her way of life.
 Magda Karina as Juana Guadarrama, a social worker responsible for monitoring Emiliano’s file.
 Violeta Isfel as La Cuquis, a famous vlogger that gives tips to first-time moms. In front of the cameras is a charm, but outside of them, she is angry. She has seven children and has gotten married three times.
 Frank Medellín as Joaquín Rosado Del Monte, he works as a flight attendant in Aerosol with Lorenza and Valentina. He admires Lorenza for her professionalism. He is a good confidant and knows how to listen.
 Lander Errasti as Emiliano, Lorenza's 1 year old nephew, who already walks and speaks and at times drives Lorenza crazy. He already recognizes Lorenza as a mom.

Recurring 
 María Prado as Rosario "Chayo" de la Cruz Gómez, she is an older woman, who was Lorenza and Raymunda’s nanny. She agrees to help take care of Emiliano temporarily.
 Oswaldo Zárate as Raúl Pedernal García, Luis Enrique’s best friend and accomplice. He has not had a stable relationship in years. He likes Valentina but she does not pay attention to him.
 Carlos López as Luciano Pérez Garris, he works in the street and looks for temporary jobs such as driving a taxi. He has a good heart and always seeks a solution to any adversity.

Production 
Production of the series began on 11 September 2018. Filming of the second season began on 8 June 2020.

Episodes

Series overview

Season 1 (2019)

Season 2 (2020) 

Notes

Awards and nominations

References

External links 
 

Las Estrellas original programming
Mexican television sitcoms
Television series by Televisa
2019 Mexican television series debuts
2020 Mexican television series endings
Spanish-language television shows